Wallace Oakes Clement (July 21, 1881 in Auburn, Maine – November 1, 1953 in Coral Gables, Florida), was a professional baseball player who played  outfield from 1908 to 1909 for the Brooklyn Superbas and Philadelphia Phillies. He attended Tufts University.

External links

1881 births
1953 deaths
Major League Baseball outfielders
Brooklyn Superbas players
Philadelphia Phillies players
Baseball players from Maine
Tufts University alumni
Sportspeople from Auburn, Maine
Jersey City Skeeters players
Sportspeople from Coral Gables, Florida